Ghasha va Shiryul (also Romanized as Ghashā va Shīryūl) is a village in Chenaneh Rural District, Fath Olmobin District, Shush County, Khuzestan Province, Iran. At the 2006 census, its population was 469, in 76 families.  The Karkheh River flows to the east.

References 

Populated places in Shush County